Basic Black is a weekly television series airing on WGBH in Boston. Originally known as Say Brother, the show was created in 1968 and aims to reflect the concerns and culture of African Americans through short-form documentaries, performances, and one-on-one conversations.

Say Brother and Basic Black together represent WGBH Boston's longest-running public affairs program produced by, for and about African Americans. In April 2000, the WGBH Media Library and Archives was awarded a National Endowment for the Humanities Archives and Special Collections Preservation and Access grant to preserve Say Brother tapes dating from 1968 to 1982. The Say Brother Collection is accessible online in the American Archive of Public Broadcasting including 83 programs and interviews.

References

External links
 Basic Black – Homepage on WGBH
Say Brother Collection in the American Archive of Public Broadcasting
 Basic Black Facebook Page – Group page on Facebook
 Say Brother Archival video clips from the WGBH Archives
 Say Brother at WGBH's Main Archive

PBS original programming
Television series by WGBH
1968 American television series debuts
1970s American television series
1980s American television news shows
1990s American television news shows
2000s American television news shows
2010s American television news shows
2020s American television news shows
African-American news and public affairs television series